Aberfoyle is a village in the historic county and registration county of Perthshire and the council area of Stirling, Scotland.

The parish of Aberfoyle takes its name from this village, and had a population of 1,065 at the 2011 census.

Geography 
The town is situated on the River Forth at the foot of Craigmore ( high). Since 1885, when the Duke of Montrose constructed a road over the eastern shoulder of Craigmore to join the older road at the entrance of the Trossachs pass, Aberfoyle has become the alternative route to the Trossachs and Loch Katrine; this road, known as the Duke's Road or Duke's Pass, was opened to the public in 1931 when the Forestry Commission acquired the land.

Towards the west end is Eilean Gorm (the green isle), and near the north-western shore are the falls of Ledard. It drains by the Avon Dhu to Loch Ard, which is drained in turn by the Forth.

Toponym 
Aberfoyle supposedly originates from the Brittonic Celtic, aber poll or aber phuill (Scottish Gaelic), meaning (place at the) mouth of the Phuill Burn (the Pow Burn enters the River Forth at Aberfoyle). Historically, alternative spellings such as Abirfull, Aberfule, Aberfoill and Aberfoil have been recorded before the current spelling became accepted by the 20th century. The river-name is from either Gaelic poll or Brittonic pol, both of which mean 'pool, sluggish water'.

Industry
The slate quarries on Craigmore which operated from the 1820s to the 1950s are now defunct; at its peak this was a major industry. Other industries included an ironworks, established in the 1720s, as well as wool spinning and a lint mill.

From 1882 the village was served by Aberfoyle railway station, the terminus of the Strathendrick and Aberfoyle Railway which connected to Glasgow via Dumbarton or Kirkintilloch. The station closed to passenger traffic in 1951, and the remaining freight services ceased in 1959.

The above industries have since died out, and Aberfoyle is supported mainly by the forestry, industry and tourism.

Tourism
Visitors were first attracted to Aberfoyle and the surrounding area after the publication of The Lady of the Lake by Sir Walter Scott in 1810. The poem described the beauty of Loch Katrine. Aberfoyle describes itself as The Gateway to the Trossachs, and is well situated for visitors to access attractions such as Loch Lomond and Inchmahome Priory at the Lake of Menteith. A tourist information office run by VisitScotland sits in the centre of town, offering free information, selling souvenirs and acting as a booking office for many of the local B&B's and hotels. Aberfoyle Golf Club was built in 1860 and is located just south of town near the Rob Roy restaurant. Aberfoyle is also part of the Loch Lomond and The Trossachs National Park.

Aberfoyle is also home to the largest Go Ape adventure course in the UK, featuring the longest death slide, or 'zip-line', in the UK.

Historical figures

Aberfoyle has connections to many historical figures such as Rob Roy and Mary, Queen of Scots. Robert Roy MacGregor was born at the head of nearby Loch Katrine, and his well-known cattle stealing exploits took him all around the area surrounding Aberfoyle. It is recorded, for example, that in 1691, the MacGregors raided every barn in the village of Kippen and stole all the villagers' livestock. There currently stands a tree in the village that MacGregor was reputed to have climbed and hid in to escape the clutches of the law. Also, Mary, Queen of Scots, visited nearby Inchmahome Priory often as a child, and during her short reign. She also used the priory during her short reign, particularly in 1547, where she felt safe from the English Army.

However, the most local historical figure is the Reverend Robert Kirk, born in 1644. It was the Rev. Kirk who provided the first translation into Scottish Gaelic of the Metrical Psalms and then the whole Christian Bible, however, he is better remembered for the publication of his book "The Secret Commonwealth of Elves, Fauns, and Fairies" in 1691. Kirk had long been researching fairies, and the book collected several personal accounts and stories of folk who claimed to have encountered them. It was after this, while Kirk was minister of Aberfoyle parish, that he died in unusual circumstances.

Kirk had long believed that the local Doon Hill was the gateway to the "Secret Commonwealth", or the Celtic Otherworld. It was a place that Kirk visited often, taking daily walks there from his manse. The story goes that the Fairies of Doon Hill were angry with the Rev. Kirk for going into the domain of the Unseelie court, where he had been warned not to go, and decided to imprison him in Doon Hill — for one night in May 1692, the Rev. Kirk went out for a walk to the hill, in his nightshirt. Some accounts claim that he simply vanished, however he suddenly collapsed. He was found and brought home, but died soon afterwards. He was buried in his own kirkyard, although local legends claim that the fairies took his body away, and the coffin contains only stones. The huge pine tree that still stands at the top of Doon Hill is said to contain Kirk's imprisoned spirit.

Kirk's cousin, Graham of Duchray, was later to claim that the spectre of Kirk had visited him in the night, and told him that he had been carried off into the Celtic Otherworld. Having left his widow pregnant, Kirk told Graham that he would appear at the baptism of his unborn child. Graham was to throw an iron knife at the apparition, which would set Kirk free from his imprisonment by the fairies. However, when the Minister's spectre appeared at the baptism, Graham of Duchray, similarly to Orpheus, was too shocked to throw the iron knife, and Kirk faded away forever.

Today, visitors to Doon Hill write their wishes on pieces of white silk, or other white cloth, and tie them to the branches of the trees for the Good People to grant.

Unfortunately some people tie plastic confectionery wrappers instead, which slightly spoils the magic of the location and may harm the ecology of the forest. It is also said that if one runs sunwise around the great 'Minister's Pine' tree at the summit seven times, then the Fairies will appear. Some people have tried this and afterwards claim to have seen apparitions. Others merely get a bit dizzy and fall over.

Use in fiction
Aberfoyle was used as the location and inspiration for the adventure novel "Les Indes noires" (English title: The Child of the Cavern) by Jules Verne.
The "Clachan of Aberfoil", then (in 1715) a small hamlet, plays a significant role in the second Volume of the novel Rob Roy by Walter Scott.
Aberfoyle is where two grandfathers grew up in Shadow Land by Adam Wright. The grandfathers are the ancestors of two sub-characters who are related to Shellycoats. In the book, it is surmised that people from Aberfoyle have a hint of the faerie in their blood.

See also
List of places in Stirling (council area)

References

External links

 
Read more about Aberfoyle and its history

Villages in Stirling (council area)
Trossachs
Highland Boundary Fault